Nikitella is a genus of flies in the family Dolichopodidae, found in Senegal. It contains only one species, Nikitella vikhrevi. Both the genus and species are named after the collector, Dr. Nikita Vikhrev.

References 

Dolichopodidae genera
Medeterinae
Monotypic Diptera genera
Diptera of Africa
Insects of West Africa
Endemic fauna of Senegal